Momordica balsamina is a tendril-bearing annual vine native to the tropical regions of Africa, introduced and invasive in Asia, Australia, Central America, and North America, where they have been found in some parts of Florida. In 1810, Thomas Jefferson planted this vine in his flower borders at Monticello along with larkspur, poppies, and nutmeg.

Description

It is a climbing annual to perennial herb up to 5 meters long. Its stem is thin, angular and slightly hairy. The alternately arranged leaves are divided into petiole and leaf blade. The hairy petiole is short. The soft, thin leaf blade is up to 12 centimeters in size, heart-shaped and broadly ovate to rounded in outline. The sparsely hairy leaf blade is palmately divided and five to seven lobes and the leaf lobes are each multiply lobed or remotely sharp-toothed. The leaf margins are entire and often pointed on the lobe tips or teeth. The thin tendrils are simple and long.

It has pale yellow, deeply veined flowers and round, somewhat warty, bright orange fruits, or "apples". When ripe, the fruits burst apart, revealing numerous seeds covered with a brilliant scarlet, extremely sticky coating.

Reproductive traits
A monoecious plant, its flowers, some of which have long stalks, appear individually, laterally, each with a bract. The single flowers are fivefold with a double perianth. The finely hairy calyx has five lobes. The corolla is white or yellow. The female flowers are short-stalked, the ovary is inferior and single-chambered and slightly below the calyx. The stylus is three-branched with a divided scar per branch. Staminodes may be present. The male flowers are longer-stalked and have five fused, fused stamens in threes, with feathery and branching anthers. At the bottom of the stamens appendages can be formed inside. 

The red or orange, leathery berries are pointed-humped, ellipsoid and short-beaked with a length of 4.5 to 7 centimeters. When the fruit ripens, it open with three flaps and release the many seeds. The up to about 1 centimeter large, elliptical and brownish, sculpted seeds are each covered in a red, sticky seed coat "pulp" (false arillus).

Uses
Some people indicated that the outer rind and the seeds of the fruit are poisonous, however the Tsonga people found in the northern region of southern Africa eat the leaves of the plant along with the fruit which bears its name. The balsam apple was introduced into Europe by 1568 and was used medicinally to treat wounds. Oleum Momordicae was understood in pharmacy as tree oil poured onto the fruits of Momordica balsamina. The fruit and leaves are used as a soap substitute. The plant sap can be used medicinally or as a metal cleaner, and it is also processed into an arrow poison.

Names
Momordica balsamina and the related Momordica charantia share some common names: African cucumber, balsam apple, and balsam pear. Other names for M. balsamina are balsamina or southern balsam pear. It is known in Africa under a broad range of names, e.g. in Mozambique as cacana and in South Africa as nkaka.

See also
Momordica charantia

References

External links
University Of South Florida

Fruits originating in Africa
balsamina
Plants used in traditional African medicine
Plants described in 1753
Taxa named by Carl Linnaeus

ne:बरेला